Pahalanpur  is a village under Raina II CD block in Bardhaman Sadar South subdivision of Purba Bardhaman district in the Indian state of West Bengal.

Geography

Madhabdihi police station has jurisdiction over Raina II CD Block.

Climate
The temperature in the summer is 28 to 32 and in winter 10 to 19.Average rainfall 175 cm.

Demographics
As per the 2011 Census of India Pahalanpur had a total population of 4,180 of which 2,109 (50%) were males and 2,071 (50%) were females. Population below 6 years was 343. The total number of literates in Pahalanpur was 3,302 (86.06% of the population over 6 years).

Economics
This is a rich agricultural area with several cold storages. Chief products are potato and rice.

Education
Pahalanpur high school is major school in Pahalanpur. There are 3 primary school in Pahalanpur.

Pahalanpur High School is a coeducational high school affiliated with the West Bengal Board of Secondary Education. It is also affiliated with West Bengal Council of Higher Secondary Education for higher secondary classes.

Transport
The Arambagh to Burdwan via Shyamsundar line crossing through the Pahalanpur.

References 

Villages in Purba Bardhaman district